Douglas C. Mintz (born 1952) is a judge on the Stamford/Norwalk District Superior Court in Connecticut. He is a former Democratic member of the Connecticut House of Representatives from Norwalk, Connecticut's 140th House district. He resigned his seat to become a judge, causing a vacancy and a special election was held to fill it in February 1993. Judge Mintz is now a partner at leading Connecticut law firm, Carmody Torrance Sandak & Hennessey LLP.

Early life and family 
He is the son of Lewis and Lea Mintz. He graduated from the University of Michigan with a B.G.S. and from Western New England College with a J.D.
He was admitted to the bar in 1978. In 1991, while serving in the Connecticut House, he met and married,  the former Democratic Clerk in the Appropriations Committee Elaine Velleca.

Political career 
He was chair of the Norwalk Conservation Commission.

He defeated incumbent Republican Janet M. Mills in 1986.

In 1992, he was selected by Governor Lowell P. Weicker, Jr. to become a Superior Court judge. A special election was called to fill the vacancy.

External links
 State of Connecticut Judicial Branch

References 

1952 births
Connecticut state court judges
Living people
Democratic Party members of the Connecticut House of Representatives
Politicians from Norwalk, Connecticut
Superior court judges in the United States
University of Michigan alumni
Western New England University alumni